Kissy may refer to:

 Kissy, Sierra Leone, neighborhood on the eastern end of Freetown, Sierra Leone
 Kissy Suzuki, fictional character in Ian Fleming's 1964 James Bond novel, You Only Live Twice
 A character in the arcade game Baraduke
 Kissy Sell Out (born 1984), English DJ
 Kissy Simmons (born 1969), American actress
 Cédric Marshall Kissy (born 1988), Ivorian poet
 Kissy Missy, a character in the horror video game Poppy Playtime

See also
 Kissi (disambiguation), a language and people in West Africa
 Kissie (born 1991), Swedish blogger